Gary Lord may refer to:

 Gary Lord (artist) (born 1952), American faux painting artist
 Gary Lord (rugby league) (born 1966), English rugby league footballer
 Gary Lord (swimmer) (born 1967), Australian freestyle swimmer